The Tirso (Latin Thyrsus) is a  river, the most important of the island of Sardinia (Italy).

European drainage basins of the Mediterranean Sea
Rivers of Italy
Rivers of Sardinia
Rivers of the Province of Sassari
Rivers of the Province of Oristano